Statistics of North American Soccer League in season 1980. This was the 13th season of the NASL.

Overview
The league comprised 24 teams; for the only time in NASL history, the lineup of teams was identical to the year before, with no clubs joining or dropping out, franchise shifts or even name changes. The New York Cosmos defeated the Fort Lauderdale Strikers in the finals on September 21 to win the championship. For the third time in league history the team with the most wins (Seattle) did not win the regular season due to the NASL's system of awarding bonus points for goals scored.

Changes from the previous season
The 1980 season saw the regular season expand from 30 games to 32 games. Three North Americans were required to be among the eleven playing in the match for each team, up from two during the previous season.

New teams
None

Teams folding
None

Teams moving
None

Name changes
None

Regular season
W = Wins, L = Losses, GF = Goals For, GA = Goals Against, PT= point system

6 points for a win,
0 points for a loss,
1 point for each regulation goal scored up to three per game.
-Premiers (most points). -Best record. -Other playoff teams.

American Conference

National Conference

NASL All-Stars

Playoffs

The top two teams from each division qualified for the playoffs automatically. The last two spots would go to the next best teams in the conference, regardless of division. The top three conference seeds went to the division winners, seeds 4-6 went to the second place teams and the last two seeds were given wild-card berths. The winners of each successive round would be reseeded within the conference by regular season point total, regardless of first-round seeding. The Soccer Bowl remained a single game final.

In 1979 and 1980, if a playoff series was tied at one win apiece, a full 30 minute mini-game was played. If there was no winner after the 30 minutes ended, the teams would then move on to a shoot-out to determine a series winner.

Bracket

First round

Conference semifinals

Conference Championships

Soccer Bowl '80

1980 NASL Champions: New York Cosmos

Post season awards
Most Valuable Player: Roger Davies, Seattle 
Coach of the year: Alan Hinton, Seattle 
Rookie of the year: Jeff Durgan, New York
 North American Player of the Year:  Jack Brand, Seattle

References

External links
 Video of 1980 goals of the year
 Complete Results and Standings

 
North American Soccer League (1968–1984) seasons
1980 in American soccer leagues
1980 in Canadian soccer